The 433rd Security Forces Squadron (433 SFS) is a United States Air Force Reserve unit located at Lackland AFB. The unit serves a law enforcement purpose, as well as focusing on combat readiness.

The 433 SFS is assigned to the 433d Airlift Wing, the "Alamo Wing". As a unit, airmen participate in monthly unit training assemblies and annual tours. 433 SFS airmen have deployed numerous times in support of Operation Enduring Freedom and Operation Iraqi Freedom.

Mission 

To protect deployed weapons systems against sabotage and enlarge a base defense force.

The unit will also provide force protection for such deployed locations as a Main Operating Base, Standy Base, Limited Base, Co-located Operating Base or Bare Base; and operate in a joint service environment to include host nation forces at all levels of conflict to include military operations other than war.

References

Military units and formations in Texas
Security squadrons of the United States Air Force